The 2012–13 East Superleague (known as the McBookie.com East Superleague for sponsorship reasons) was the 11th season of the East Superleague, the top tier of league competition for SJFA East Region member clubs.

The season began on 1 September 2012 and ended on 15 June 2013. Bonnyrigg Rose Athletic were the reigning champions.

There was no relegation this season as the Superleague expanded from twelve to sixteen in 2013–14.

Linlithgow Rose won the title on 27 April 2013, becoming the first club to win the East Superleague on three occasions, and also becoming the first team to go the full season unbeaten in the league. As champions they entered the First Round of the 2013–14 Scottish Cup.

Teams

To East Superleague
Promoted from East Premier League
Sauchie Juniors
Broxburn Athletic

From East Superleague
Relegated to East Premier League
Bathgate Thistle
In abeyance 
Forfar West End

Stadia and locations

Managerial changes

League table

Results

References

6
East Superleague seasons